The Pitch That Killed: Carl Mays, Ray Chapman and the Pennant Race of 1920 is a non-fiction baseball book written by Mike Sowell and published in 1989. The book concentrates on the 1920 major league season, especially the events surrounding Ray Chapman's death from a pitch thrown by Carl Mays.

It won the CASEY Award for best baseball book of 1989 and was selected as a New York Times "Notable Book of the Year."

Come Aboard Productions optioned the film rights to Mike Sowell's book in 2013. In 2020, Los Angeles-based Bronson Park Films and SMA Creative acquired the documentary rights with Come Aboard Productions co-producing the project. Believeland director Andrew Billman is helming the documentary film titled War on the Diamond. The project is filming in 2021 with a planned Fall 2022 release.

References 

1989 non-fiction books
Macmillan Publishers books
Major League Baseball books
1920 Major League Baseball season